XXL is the second studio album by Gordon Goodwin's Big Phat Band, released on September 23, 2003. It includes guest performances by saxophonist Michael Brecker, vocal group Take 6, clarinetist Eddie Daniels, and singer Johnny Mathis.

XXL was nominated for the Grammy Award for Best Large Jazz Ensemble Album. Gordon Goodwin received two more nominations, one for Best Instrumental Composition ("Hunting Wabbits") and one for Best Instrumental Arrangement Accompanying Vocalist ("Comes Love").

Track listing 

Source: AllMusic

Personnel

 Gordon Goodwin – saxophone, piano, arranger, conductor
 Wayne Bergeron – trumpet
 Pete DeSiena – trumpet
 Daniel Fornero – trumpet
 Larry Hall – trumpet
 Stan Martin – trumpet
 Dan Savant – trumpet
 Bob Summers – trumpet
 Steven Holtman – trombone
 Alex Iles – trombone
 Nick Lane – trombone
 Andy Martin – trombone
 Charlie Morillas – trombone
 Craig Ware – bass trombone
 Sal Lozano – flute, alto saxophone, soprano saxophone
 Eric Marienthal – flute, alto saxophone, soprano saxophone
 John Yoakum – alto saxophone
 Brian Scanlon – clarinet, flute, tenor saxophone
 Jeff Driskill – clarinet, flute, tenor saxophone
 Eddie Daniels – clarinet
 Jay Mason – bass clarinet, flute, baritone saxophone
 Grant Geissman – guitar
 Carl Verheyen – guitar
 Richard Shaw – double bass, bass guitar
 Ray Brinker – drums
 Bernie Dresel – drums
 Luis Conte – percussion
 Mark Kibble – vocal arrangement

Guests

 Michael Brecker – saxophone
 Johnny Mathis – vocals
 Brian McKnight – vocals
 Take 6 – vocals
 Peter Erskine – drums

Production

 Gordon Goodwin – producer, liner notes
 Jeff Dean – executive producer
 Bob Michaels – executive producer
 John Trickett – executive producer
 Dan Savant – producer
 Bernie Grundman – mastering
 Steve Genewick – engineer
 Charles Paakkari – engineer
 Sam Story – engineer
 Kevin Szymanski – engineer
 Tommy Vicari – engineer
 Jeff Wakolbinger – engineer

References

2003 albums
Gordon Goodwin's Big Phat Band albums